Nate Tate (born January 12, 1979) is an American politician who has served in the Missouri House of Representatives from the 119th district since 2017.

References

1979 births
Living people
Republican Party members of the Missouri House of Representatives
21st-century American politicians
People from Washington, Missouri
Fontbonne University alumni